The IEEE Journal of Oceanic Engineering is a journal published by the Institute of Electrical and Electronics Engineers.  The journal's editor in chief is Associate Professor Mandar Chitre, of the National University of Singapore.
According to the Journal Citation Reports, the journal has a 2020 impact factor of 3.554.

References

External links

Engineering journals
IEEE academic journals
Marine engineering